Ciprocinonide (developmental code name RS-2386), also known as fluocinolone acetonide cyclopropylcarboxylate, is a synthetic glucocorticoid corticosteroid which was never marketed.

References

Acetonides
Secondary alcohols
Carboxylic acids
Corticosteroid cyclic ketals
Corticosteroid esters
Cyclopropanes
Fluoroarenes
Glucocorticoids
Pregnanes